Erongarícuaro, which means "Place of waiting" in the Purepecha language, is a town in the Mexican state of Michoacán. It is located about an hour and a half drive to Morelia or Uruapan and just 20 minutes from the famous colonial town of Pátzcuaro. The estimated population is about 5,000 people.

History

The town
Erongarícuaro is hidden high in the mountains of Michoacán at 2,200 m (7,130 feet) of elevation.  To the east is Lake Pátzcuaro, one of Mexico's highest lakes.

The town retains its ancient atmosphere. It consists of largely one-story adobe or plaster-over-brick buildings with red tile roofs. The streets are dusty cobblestones traveled by horse and car. The plaza has a fountain, stage and amazing collection of trees.

Wandering the streets uphill, there is a cemetery and a chapel.

Culture

 Annual Flower Show
 Tuesday Goodness Market - with homemade breads and cheeses

Entertainment
Jaripeos, parties and festivals are common throughout the year.

Food
The nieve (ice cream), sold in shops on the plaza, is a delightful treat. There are many different flavors, made with water or cream. Combinations of flavors add variety and taste. One of the most popular flavors is called pasta (paste).  Popsicles made from exotic fruits are a pleasant taste adventure.

Except for early evening there is always food on the plaza. Food in the evening would be atole (hot beverage) with buñuelos (light fried pastries) or tamales.

Shopping

 Women's craft market
 Furniture and woodcrafts

Notable residents of Eronga
 Lázaro Cárdenas - The popular leftist President of Mexico was rumored to take his boat across the lake where no road reached. He began from his large mansion in Pátzcuaro, which now houses CREFAL  and upon reaching Erongarícuaro was free to attend fiestas with his friends Victoria and Guadalupe Rodríguez in Casa Las Rosas. The president arranged for the two young women, who were singers of some note on local radio and in local concerts, to attend music and voice classes at Bellas Artes in Mexico City, but their conservative father refused to let them, saying, "A young woman's place is in the home." Victoria came to be the town's mayor — the only female mayor in the history of the town — and her sister Guadalupe was the town's postmistress. The post office was in the entrance of the house. Victoria later married Ralph Gray, an American painter who came to the town in the late 1940s.

During Mexico's postwar art scene:
Trotsky, Frida Kahlo, Diego Rivera, Jean Charlot, André Breton.
Roberto Matta, Remedios Varo, Esteban Francis, Pierre Mabille, Benjamin Péret
Gordon Onslow Ford and his wife Jacqueline Johnson, an American writer
Peruvian poet César Moro, anthropologist Miguel Covarrubias, painter Carlos Mérida
Surrealist painter Wolfgang Paalen with painter and poet Alice Rahon, and photographer Eva Sulzer

Current artists:
Painter Brian Fey lives as a reclusive hermit in the forest of nearby Cerro Chivo.
Painter and ceramic artist Jon Skaglund lives and works in the village.
Maureen Rosenthal, artist and founder in 1981 of UNEAMICH, the Erongarícuaro artists' cooperative.

References

External links
 Municipal government site

 Erongaricuaro weather
 Information about the municipio of Erongaricuaro, in Spanish
 Information about Erongarícuaro published on a website by David Haun, in English

Populated places in Michoacán